Yanawara (in the local language, also spelled Yanahuara) is a  mountain in the Andes of Peru, about  high. It is located in the Puno Region, Lampa Province, on the border of the districts Palca and Paratía. Yanawara is situated southeast of the higher mountain named Yanawara and the peaks of Wira Apachita and Yaritayuq, and northeast of the lake Sayt'uqucha.

References

Mountains of Puno Region
Mountains of Peru